Anatoli Dmitrievich Golovnya (20 January 1900, Simferopol – 25 June 1982, Moscow) was a Soviet cinematographer, renowned for his work with Vsevolod Pudovkin (with whom he was awarded the Stalin Prize in 1951). In 1969 he was a member of the jury at the 6th Moscow International Film Festival. He was a professor at Moscow's renowned Institute of Cinema (VGIK). One of his students at VGIK was Mikhail Vartanov.

Selected filmography
 Chess Fever (1925)
 Mother (1925)
 The Bricks (1925)
 Mechanics of the Brain (1926)
 Man from the Restaurant (1927)
 The End of St. Petersburg (1927)
 Storm Over Asia (1928)
 The Living Corpse (1929)
 The Deserter (1933)
 Victory (1938)
 Minin and Pozharsky (1939)
 Suvorov (1941)
 Elusive Ian (1942)
 Admiral Nakhimov (1946)
 Zhukovsky (1950)

References

External links
 

1900 births
1982 deaths
People from Simferopol
People from Taurida Governorate
Communist Party of the Soviet Union members
Academic staff of the Gerasimov Institute of Cinematography
Heroes of Socialist Labour
Stalin Prize winners
Recipients of the Order of Lenin
Recipients of the Order of the Red Banner of Labour
Soviet cinematographers